The Zayed International Prize for the Environment is a prize awarded by the Zayed International Foundation for the Environment.

The Zayed Prize, worth 1 million US dollars is awarded every two years, in the name of the late Sheikh Zayed Bin Sultan Al Nahyan, based on stringent selection criteria.

The Zayed Prize is classified into four award categories. The recipient of the Global Leadership on the Environment component receives $USD 500,000, the recipient of the Scientific and Technological Achievement component receives $USD 250,000, and the recipient of the Environmental Action Leading to Positive Change in Society component receives $USD 200,000 and Young Scientists Award for Environmental Sustainability $USD 50,000   The value of the prize is the highest of any environmental prize.
 
The prize was established in 1999 by Sheikh Mohammed bin Rashid Al Maktoum and was first awarded in 2001.  The prize was named after Sheikh Zayed Bin Sultan Al Nahyan.

Winners

Global Leadership on the Environment

Scientific and Technological Achievement

Environmental Action Leading to Positive Change in Society

See also

 List of environmental awards

References

External links 
Zayed International Prize for the Environment

Awards established in 1999
Environmental awards